Ottendorf-Okrilla is a municipality in the Bautzen district, Saxony, Germany. It is located 20 km northeast of Dresden.

Geography
The area of the municipality is 25.88 km², of which 1.58 km² are commercially used. The length from north to south is 6 km and the east to west length is 7 km. The municipality is subdivided into the Ortsteile Grünberg, Hermsdorf, Medingen and Ottendorf-Okrilla. It has two exits on the motorway A4 (Dresden - Görlitz) and four stations on the railway from Dresden to Königsbrück.

History
Ottendorf was first mentioned in 1346. The municipality Ottendorf-Okrilla was formed in 1921 by the merger of the former municipalities Ottendorf, Moritzdorf, Großokrilla, Kleinokrilla and Cunnersdorf. In 1994 Grünberg joined the municipality, and in 1999 Hermsdorf and Medingen.

Population

Economy
Ottendorf-Okrilla has about 6,500 jobs in about 700 companies. It is also the location of the letter processing center of the Deutsche Post for the Dresden area.

References

External links
 

Populated places in Bautzen (district)